Coumarin or 2H-chromen-2-one is an aromatic organic chemical compound with formula .  Its molecule can be described as a benzene molecule with two adjacent hydrogen atoms replaced by a lactone-like chain , forming a second six-membered heterocycle that shares two carbons with the benzene ring. It can be placed in the benzopyrone chemical class and considered as a lactone.

Coumarin is a colorless crystalline solid with a sweet odor resembling the scent of vanilla and a bitter taste. It is found in many plants, where it may serve as a chemical defense against predators. By inhibiting synthesis of vitamin K, a related compound is used as the prescription drug warfarin – an anticoagulant – to inhibit formation of blood clots, deep vein thrombosis, and pulmonary embolism.

Etymology
Coumarin is derived from coumarou, the French word for the tonka bean. The word tonka for the tonka bean is taken from the Galibi (Carib) tongue spoken by natives of French Guiana (one source for the plant); it also appears in Old Tupi, another language of the same region, as the name of the tree. The old genus name, Coumarouna, was formed from another Tupi name for tree, kumarú.

History 
Coumarin was first isolated from tonka beans in 1820 by A. Vogel of Munich, who initially mistook it for benzoic acid.

Also in 1820, Nicholas Jean Baptiste Gaston Guibourt (1790–1867) of France independently isolated coumarin, but he realized that it was not benzoic acid.  In a subsequent essay he presented to the pharmacy section of the Académie Royale de Médecine, Guibourt named the new substance coumarine.

In 1835, the French pharmacist A. Guillemette proved that Vogel and Guibourt had isolated the same substance. Coumarin was first synthesized in 1868 by the English chemist William Henry Perkin.

Coumarin has been an integral part of the fougère genre of perfume since it was first used in Houbigant's Fougère Royale in 1882.

Synthesis 
Coumarin can be prepared by a number of name reactions, with the Perkin reaction between salicylaldehyde and acetic anhydride being a popular example. The Pechmann condensation provides another route to coumarin and its derivatives, as does the Kostanecki acylation, which can also be used to produce chromones.

Biosynthesis
From lactonization of ortho-hydroxylated cis-hydroxycinnamic acid.

Natural occurrence
Coumarin is found naturally in many plants. Freshly ground plant parts contain higher amount of desired and undesired phytochemicals than powder. In addition, whole plant parts are harder to counterfeit; for example, one study showed that authentic Ceylon cinnamon bark contained 0.012 to 0.143 mg/g coumarin, but samples purchased at markets contained up to 3.462 mg/g, possibly because those were mixed with other cinnamon varieties.

 Vanilla grass (Anthoxanthum odoratum)
 Sweet woodruff (Galium odoratum)
 Sweet grass (Hierochloe odorata)
 Sweet-clover (genus Melilotus)
 Tonka bean (Dipteryx odorata)
 Cinnamon; a 2013 study showed different varieties containing different levels of coumarin:
 Ceylon cinnamon or true cinnamon (Cinnamomum verum): 0.005 to 0.090 mg/g
 Chinese cinnamon or Chinese cassia (C. cassia): 0.085 to 0.310 mg/g
 Indonesian cinnamon or Padang cassia (C. burmannii): 2.14 to 9.30 mg/g
 Saigon cinnamon or Vietnamese cassia (C. loureiroi): 1.06 to 6.97 mg/g
 Deertongue (Carphephorus odoratissimus),
 Tilo (Justicia pectoralis),
 Mullein (genus Verbascum)
 Many cherry blossom tree varieties (of the genus Prunus).
 Related compounds are found in some but not all specimens of genus Glycyrrhiza, from which the root and flavour licorice derives.

Coumarin is found naturally also in many edible plants such as strawberries, black currants, apricots, and cherries.

Coumarins were found to be uncommon but occasional components of propolis by Santos-Buelga and Gonzalez-Paramas 2017.

Biological function 
Coumarin has appetite-suppressing properties, which may discourage animals from eating plants that contain it. Though the compound has a pleasant sweet odor, it has a bitter taste, and animals tend to avoid it.

Metabolism 
The biosynthesis of coumarin in plants is via hydroxylation, glycolysis, and cyclization of cinnamic acid. In humans, the enzyme encoded by the gene UGT1A8 has glucuronidase activity with many substrates, including coumarins.

Related compounds and derivatives 
Coumarin and its derivatives are all considered phenylpropanoids.

Some naturally occurring coumarin derivatives include umbelliferone (7-hydroxycoumarin), aesculetin (6,7-dihydroxycoumarin), herniarin (7-methoxycoumarin), psoralen and imperatorin.

4-Phenylcoumarin is the backbone of the neoflavones, a type of neoflavonoids.

Coumarin pyrazole hybrids have been synthesized from hydrazones, carbazones and thiocarbazones via Vilsmeier Haack formylation reaction.

Compounds derived from coumarin are also called coumarins or coumarinoids; this family includes:
 brodifacoum
 bromadiolone
 difenacoum
 auraptene
 ensaculin
 phenprocoumon (Marcoumar)
 PSB-SB-487
 PSB-SB-1202
 Scopoletin can be isolated from the bark of Shorea pinanga
 warfarin (Coumadin)

Coumarin is transformed into the natural anticoagulant dicoumarol by a number of species of fungi. This occurs as the result of the production of 4-hydroxycoumarin, then further (in the presence of naturally occurring formaldehyde) into the actual anticoagulant dicoumarol, a fermentation product and mycotoxin. Dicoumarol was responsible for the bleeding disease known historically as "sweet clover disease" in cattle eating moldy sweet clover silage. In basic research, preliminary evidence exists for coumarin having various biological activities, including anti-inflammatory, anti-tumor, antibacterial, and antifungal properties, among others.

Uses

Medicine
Warfarin – a coumarin – with brand name, Coumadin, is a prescription drug used as an anticoagulant to inhibit formation of blood clots, and so is a therapy for deep vein thrombosis and pulmonary embolism. It may be used to prevent recurrent blood clot formation from atrial fibrillation, thrombotic stroke, and transient ischemic attacks.

Coumarins have shown some evidence of biological activity and have limited approval for few medical uses as pharmaceuticals, such as in the treatment of lymphedema. Both coumarin and 1,3-indandione derivatives produce a uricosuric effect, presumably by interfering with the renal tubular reabsorption of urate.

Rodenticide precursor
Coumarin is used in the pharmaceutical industry as a precursor reagent in the synthesis of a number of synthetic anticoagulant pharmaceuticals similar to dicoumarol. 4-hydroxycoumarins are a type of vitamin K antagonist. They block the regeneration and recycling of vitamin K. These chemicals are sometimes also incorrectly referred to as "coumadins" rather than 4-hydroxycoumarins. Some of the 4-hydroxycoumarin anticoagulant class of chemicals are designed to have high potency and long residence times in the body, and these are used specifically as rodenticides ("rat poison"). Death occurs after a period of several days to two weeks, usually from internal hemorrhaging.

Laser dyes
Coumarin dyes are extensively used as gain media in blue-green tunable organic dye lasers.   Among the various coumarin laser dyes are coumarins 480, 490, 504, 521, 504T, and 521T. Coumarin tetramethyl laser dyes offer wide tunability and high laser gain, and they are also used as active medium in coherent OLED emitters. and as a sensitizer in older photovoltaic technologies.

Perfumes and aromatizers
Coumarin is often found in artificial vanilla substitutes, despite having been banned as a food additive in numerous countries since the mid-20th century. It is still used as a legal flavorant in soaps, rubber products, and the tobacco industry, particularly for sweet pipe tobacco and certain alcoholic drinks.

Toxicity 
Coumarin is moderately toxic to the liver and kidneys of rodents, with a median lethal dose (LD50) of 293 mg/kg in the rat, a low toxicity compared to related compounds. Coumarin is hepatotoxic in rats, but less so in mice. Rodents metabolize it mostly to 3,4-coumarin epoxide, a toxic, unstable compound that on further differential metabolism may cause liver cancer in rats and lung tumors in mice. Humans metabolize it mainly to 7-hydroxycoumarin, a compound of lower toxicity, and no adverse affect has been directly measured in humans. The German Federal Institute for Risk Assessment has established a tolerable daily intake (TDI) of 0.1 mg coumarin per kg body weight, but also advises that higher intake for a short time is not dangerous. The Occupational Safety and Health Administration (OSHA) of the United States does not classify coumarin as a carcinogen for humans.

European health agencies have warned against consuming high amounts of cassia bark, one of the four main species of cinnamon, because of its coumarin content.  According to the German Federal Institute for Risk Assessment (BFR), 1 kg of (cassia) cinnamon powder contains about 2.1 to 4.4 g of coumarin.  Powdered cassia cinnamon weighs 0.56 g/cm3, so a kilogram of cassia cinnamon powder equals 362.29 teaspoons. One teaspoon of cassia cinnamon powder therefore contains 5.8 to 12.1 mg of coumarin, which may be above the tolerable daily intake value for smaller individuals. However, the BFR only cautions against high daily intake of foods containing coumarin. Its report specifically states that Ceylon cinnamon (Cinnamomum verum) contains "hardly any" coumarin.

The European Regulation (EC) No 1334/2008 describes the following maximum limits for coumarin: 50 mg/kg in traditional and/or seasonal bakery ware containing a reference to cinnamon in the labeling, 20 mg/kg in breakfast cereals including muesli, 15 mg/kg in fine bakery ware, with the exception of traditional and/or seasonal bakery ware containing a reference to cinnamon in the labeling, and 5 mg/kg in desserts.

An investigation from the Danish Veterinary and Food Administration in 2013 shows that bakery goods characterized as fine bakery ware exceeds the European limit (15 mg/kg) in almost 50% of the cases. The paper also mentions tea as an additional important contributor to the overall coumarin intake, especially for children with a sweet habit.

Coumarin was banned as a food additive in the United States in 1954, largely because of the hepatotoxicity results in rodents. Coumarin is currently listed by the Food and Drug Administration (FDA) of the United States among "Substances Generally Prohibited From Direct Addition or Use as Human Food," according to 21 CFR 189.130, but some natural additives containing coumarin, such as the flavorant sweet woodruff are allowed "in alcoholic beverages only" under 21 CFR 172.510. In Europe, popular examples of such beverages are Maiwein, white wine with woodruff, and Żubrówka, vodka flavoured with bison grass.

Coumarin is subject to restrictions on its use in perfumery, as some people may become sensitized to it, however the evidence that coumarin can cause an allergic reaction in humans is disputed.

Minor neurological dysfunction was found in children exposed to the anticoagulants acenocoumarol or phenprocoumon during pregnancy. A group of 306 children were tested at ages 7–15 years to determine subtle neurological effects from anticoagulant exposure. Results showed a dose–response relationship between anticoagulant exposure and minor neurological dysfunction. Overall, a 1.9 (90%) increase in minor neurological dysfunction was observed for children exposed to these anticoagulants, which are collectively referred to as "coumarins." In conclusion, researchers stated, "The results suggest that coumarins have an influence on the development of the brain which can lead to mild neurologic dysfunctions in children of school age."

Coumarin's presence in cigarette tobacco caused Brown & Williamson executive Dr. Jeffrey Wigand to contact CBS's news show 60 Minutes in 1995, charging that a “form of rat poison” was in the tobacco. He held that from a chemist’s point of view, coumarin is an “immediate precursor” to the rodenticide coumadin. Dr. Wigand later stated that coumarin itself is dangerous, pointing out that the FDA had banned its addition to human food in 1954. Under his later testimony, he would repeatedly classify coumarin as a "lung-specific carcinogen." In Germany, coumarin is banned as an additive in tobacco.

Alcoholic beverages sold in the European Union are limited to a maximum of 10 mg/L coumarin by law. Cinnamon flavor is generally cassia bark steam-distilled to concentrate the cinnamaldehyde, for example, to about 93%. Clear cinnamon-flavored alcoholic beverages generally test negative for coumarin, but if whole cassia bark is used to make mulled wine, then coumarin shows up at significant levels.

References 

 
Fluorescent dyes
Fuel dyes
Laser gain media
Plant toxins
Sweet-smelling chemicals